The Article 20 of the Japanese Constitution provides for freedom of religion in Japan, and the government generally respects this right in practice.

Religious demography

The government of Japan does not require religious groups to report their membership, so it was difficult to accurately determine the number of adherents to different religious groups. The Agency for Cultural Affairs reported in 2017 that membership claims by religious groups totaled 182 million. This is out of a total population of 127 million, but does not account for overlapping memberships (some families may be registered at both a Buddhist temple and a Shinto shrine), or double membership due to change of address. This number, which is nearly twice Japan's population, reflects many citizens' affiliation with multiple religions. For example, it is very common for Japanese to practice both Buddhist and Shinto rites.

According to the Agency's annual yearbook, 85 million persons identify themselves as Shinto, 88 million as Buddhist, 2 million as Christian, and 8 million follow "other" religions, including Tenrikyo, Seicho-no-Ie, the Church of World Messianity, and PL Kyodan. Academics estimate that there are 120 thousand Muslims in Japan, 10 percent of whom are Japanese citizens. The Israeli Embassy estimates that there are approximately 2,000 Jews in the country, most of them foreign-born.

As of December 2017, under the 1951 Religious Juridical Persons Law, the Government recognized 157 schools of Buddhism. The six major schools of Buddhism are Tendai, Shingon, Jōdō, Zen (Sōtō and Rinzai sects), Nichiren, and Nanto Rokushū. In addition, there are a number of Buddhist lay organizations, including Soka Gakkai, which reported a membership of eight million. The two main schools of Shinto are the Association of Shinto Shrines and Kyohashinto. In addition, the postwar legal changes ended the Japanese imperial regime's use of discourses of "not religion" (hishūkyō) to protect the religious privileges of state backed Shinto movements.

Status of religious freedom

Legal and policy framework
The Constitution provides for freedom of religion, and the government respects this right in practice. At all levels, the Japanese Government seeks to protect this right in full and does not tolerate its abuse, either by governmental or private actors.

As of December 2016, 181,098 out of 216,927 religious groups were certified by the government as religious organizations with corporate status, according to the Agency for Cultural Affairs. The government does not require religious groups to register or apply for certification; however, certified religious organizations receive tax benefits. More than 83 percent of religious groups were certified by 2016.

In the wake of the 1995 sarin gas attack on Tokyo's subway system by Aum Shinrikyo, the Religious Juridical Persons Law was amended in 1996 to provide the government with the authority to supervise certified religious groups. The amended law requires certified religious organizations to disclose their assets to the government and empowers the government to investigate possible violations of regulations governing for-profit activities. Authorities have the right to suspend a religious organization's for-profit activities if they violate these regulations.

Restrictions on religious freedom
Government policy and practice contributed to the generally free practice of religion. Unlike in previous reporting periods, there were no reports of restrictions on religious freedom. There were no reports of religious prisoners or detainees in the country.

Forced religious conversion
There is a possibility that victims of international abduction by a Japanese parent will be raised in a different religious context from those in which the parent(s) report the victim to have been abducted.

Human Rights Without Frontiers reported a long-standing and persistent trend of abduction and deprivation of religious freedom in Japan for the purpose of religious de-conversions, in which families abduct a loved one who has adopted a faith seen as too extreme, confine them, and pressure them to give up their faith. The organization criticized the inactivity of Japanese police and judicial authorities in investigating and prosecuting this form of domestic violence in which kidnappings and long-term detentions are organized by family members in cooperation with "exit counselors". Victims can suffer from severe psychological problems including PTSD (post traumatic stress disorder). HRWF emphasizes the extreme case of one Toro Goto, a Unification Church member, who was violently abducted and held in isolation for 12 years. Japanese officials are accused of acting passively and to have failed to investigate and indict his kidnappers. HRWF gives two pages of recommendations to the Japanese authorities and civil society in the conclusion of their report. HRWF submitted its report at the United Nations' 98th session of the Working Group on Enforced or Involuntary Disappearances held 31 October 2012 in Geneva, Switzerland, entitled Religious Discrimination in Japan. The U.S. State Department used the Human Rights Without Frontiers report and in the 2011 annual International Religious Freedom Report to Japan summarized that deprogrammers cooperate with family members on abductions of members of different minority religious groups for several years. Although the number of cases decreased in the 1990s, abductions and deprogramming of Unification Church members continue to occur.

Other cases
U.S. State Department in its annual 2011 report mentioned a case of 14 Muslims, who filed a lawsuit against the government, when leaked documents showed, that Tokyo Metropolitan Police Department and the National Police Agency systematically collected their personal data, religious activities and associations, allegedly because of their religion. Case was still ongoing on end of 2011.

Societal abuses and discrimination

Christian employees are widely expected to submit to group norms and work on the Sabbath and/or Christmas Day when asked, despite Japanese employment law.

See also
Religion in Japan
Human rights in Japan

References
 United States Bureau of Democracy, Human Rights and Labor. Japan: International Religious Freedom Report 2007 and Japan: International Religious Freedom Report 2010. This article incorporates text from these sources, which are in the public domain.

Japan
Human rights in Japan
Religion in Japan